The Kalan Bazaar is a bazaar located in Rawalpindi. The bazaar houses fancy garments, jewellery, electronics, flowers and shrouds.

History
Kalan is a Persian word for "big".

The historical importance of Kalan Bazar was so much that President Richard Nixon, who came to Pakistan during the presidency of General Ayub Khan, paid a special visit to it. In addition, Quaid-e-Azam Muhammad Ali Jinnah, Fatima Jinnah, Zulfiqar Ali Bhutto, Khan Abdul Wali Khan, Mumtaz Daultana, Sardar Shaukat Hayat, Ataullah Shah Bukhari, Mufti Mahmood, Shah Ahmad Noorani, Agha Shorish Kashmiri, Ghulam Ullah Khan, and Ehtisham ul Haq Thanvi were also present in the bazaar when dignitaries came.

References

Further reading
Khan, Ali (2015). RawulPindee - The Raj Years

Shopping districts and streets in Pakistan
Tourist attractions in Rawalpindi
Populated places in Rawalpindi City
Rawalpindi City
Bazaars in Rawalpindi